Ferdinand Kürnberger (3 July 1821, Vienna – 14 October 1879, Munich) was an Austrian writer.

He was one of the most influential writers of Viennese literature in the sixties and seventies of the 19th century. He is now known mainly for his participation in the revolution of 1848, which would oblige him to flee to Dresden, Germany where he was arrested the following year.

Works 
 Geglaubt und vergessen (1836)
 Der Amerika-Müde, amerikanisches Kulturbild (1855)
 Ausgewählte Novellen (1858)
 Literarische Herzenssachen. Reflexionen und Kritiken (1877)  
 Das Schloß der Frevel (1903)

References 
 "Kürnberger, Ferdinand". Encyclopædia Britannica.

Austrian journalists
Austrian male writers
1821 births
1879 deaths
19th-century journalists
Male journalists
19th-century male writers